Myogenic factor 6 (also known as Mrf4 or herculin) is a protein that in humans is encoded by the MYF6 gene.

This gene is also known in the biomedical literature as MRF4 and herculin. MYF6 is a myogenic regulatory factor (MRF) involved in the process known as myogenesis.

Function 

MYF6/Mrf4 is a member of the myogenic factor (MRF) family of transcription factors that regulate skeletal muscle myogenesis and muscle regeneration. Myogenic factors are basic helix-loop-helix (bHLH) transcription factors.
MYF6 is a gene that encodes a protein involved in the regulation of myogenesis. The precise role(s) of Myf6/Mrf4 in myogenesis are unclear, although in mice it is able to initiate myogenesis in the absence of Myf5 and MyoD, two other MRFs. The portion of the protein integral to myogenesis regulation requires the basic helix-loop-helix (bHLH) domain that is conserved among all of the genes in the MRF family.

MYF6 is expressed exclusively in skeletal muscle, and it is expressed at a higher levels in adult skeletal muscle than all of the other MRF family genes.  In mouse, Myf6/Mrf4 differs somewhat from the other MRF genes due to its two-phase expression.  Initially, Myf6 is transiently expressed along with Myf-5 in the somites during the early stages of myogenesis. However, it is more noticeably expressed postnatally. This suggests that it serves an important role in the maintenance and repair of adult skeletal muscle.

The MYF6 gene is physically linked to the MYF5 gene on chromosome 12, and similar linkage is observed in all vertebrates.  Mutations in the mouse Myf6 gene typically exhibit reduced levels of Myf5. Despite reductions in muscle mass of the back and defective rib formation, Myf6 mutants still exhibit fairly normal skeletal muscle.  This demonstrates that Myf6 is not essential for the formation of most myofibers, at least in the strains of mice tested.

In zebrafish, Myf6/Mrf4 is expressed in all terminally differentiated muscle examined, but expression has not been reported in muscle precursor cells.

Clinical significance 

Mutations in the MYF6 gene are associated with autosomal dominant centronuclear myopathy (ADCNM) and Becker's muscular dystrophy.

References

Further reading 

Transcription factors